Dances and Ballads is an album by the jazz group the World Saxophone Quartet, released in 1988 and featuring performances by Hamiet Bluiett, Julius Hemphill, Oliver Lake and David Murray.

Reception

The AllMusic review by Scott Yanow awarded the album 4 stars, stating, "This is an underrated release, recorded between their better-known Plays Duke Ellington and Rhythm and Blues CDs."

The authors of the Penguin Guide to Jazz Recordings commented: "There's a broader big-band sound to Dances and Ballads, achieved without the addition of outsiders... there's a fine version of David Murray's Pres tribute, 'For Lester'... and Oliver Lake's 'West African Snap', 'Belly Up', and 'Adjacent' are among the best of his recorded compositions."

Track listing
 "Sweet D" (Hemphill) - 6:35  
 "For Lester" (Murray) - 4:20  
 "Belly Up" (Lake) - 6:44  
 "Cool Red" (Hemphill) - 5:12  
 "Hattie Wall" (Bluiett) - 4:04  
 "Adjacent" (Lake) - 4:49  
 "West African Snap" (Lake) - 3:41  
 "Full, Deep and Mellow" (Bluiett) - 3:16  
 "Dance Until Dawn (For Little Anthony)" (Murray) - 7:08  
 "Fast Life" (Murray) - 3:01

Personnel
Hamiet Bluiett — baritone saxophone
Julius Hemphill — alto saxophone
Oliver Lake — alto saxophone
David Murray — tenor saxophone

References 

1988 albums
World Saxophone Quartet albums